Anja Lenaers (born 28 March 1972) is a Belgian former racing cyclist. She finished in third place in the Belgian National Road Race Championships in 1994, 1997 and 1998.

References

External links

1972 births
Living people
Belgian female cyclists
Cyclists from Limburg (Belgium)
People from Riemst